Below is a list of adventure films released in the 2010s.

2010

2011

2012

2013

2014

2015

2016

2017

2018

2019

2020

2021

2022

Notes

2010s
Lists of 2010s films by genre